Alan Newton (born 19 March 1931) is a retired track cyclist from Great Britain. Born in Stockport, Cheshire, Newton began cycling in 1946, with the Manchester Wheelers' Club. He represented his native country at the 1952 Summer Olympics in Helsinki, Finland. There he won the bronze medal in the men's 4,000 metres team pursuit, alongside Donald Burgess, George Newberry, and Ronald Stretton. He also competed at the UCI Track Cycling World Championships where they finished 4th.

Newton was completing an apprenticeship to become an electrician at the time he was competing, and said the training consisted of 40 hours a week, riding his bike with a toolkit on his back. An off-road cycling route from Marple to Stockport, the Alan Newton Way, is named in his honour.

References

External links
 
 
 

1931 births
Living people
English track cyclists
English male cyclists
Cyclists at the 1952 Summer Olympics
Olympic cyclists of Great Britain
Olympic bronze medallists for Great Britain
Olympic medalists in cycling
Sportspeople from Stockport
Medalists at the 1952 Summer Olympics